"Shame on You" is a single from the Indigo Girls album Shaming of the Sun released in 1997. The song's lyrics celebrate Chicano culture ("I go down to Chicano city park/cause it makes me feel so fine") and strongly criticize efforts against illegal immigration as being racist ("The white folks like to pretend it's not/but their music's in the air") and hypocritical ("They say we be looking for illegal immigrants/can we check your car/I say you know it's funny I think we were on the same boat/back in 1694").

Steve Earle sings backup and plays harmonica on the song.

The song was inspired by filmmaker David Zeiger's documentary Displaced in the New South.

References

External links
Lyrics at Indigo Girls' website

1997 singles
Indigo Girls songs
1997 songs
Songs written by Amy Ray
Songs against racism and xenophobia
Epic Records singles